Stelis guttata is a species of orchid plant native to Panama.

References 

guttata
Flora of Panama